Cee-Lo Green and His Perfect Imperfections is the debut studio album by American singer-songwriter Cee Lo Green, released on April 23, 2002. The album features guest appearances from Jahalla, Kirkland Underground, John Popper (of Blues Traveler), Joey Huffman and fellow Dungeon Family rappers Big Gipp  and Backbone.

Track listing

References 

2002 debut albums
CeeLo Green albums
Arista Records albums
Hip hop soul albums